Tisopurine (or thiopurinol) is a drug used in the treatment of gout in some countries. It reduces uric acid production through inhibiting an early stage in its production.

References 

Thiocarbonyl compounds
Pyrazolopyrimidines
Xanthine oxidase inhibitors